Barbara Cleveland is an Australian contemporary performance art collective who primarily work on Gadigal land in Sydney, Australia. Barbara Cleveland's works examine the histories of visual and performing arts and are informed by queer and feminist theories.

History
The members of the group are Diana Baker Smith, Frances Barrett, Kate Blackmore, and Kelly Doley. The artists started their collaborative practice in 2005 while studying at the College of Fine Art at the University of New South Wales. Since 2011, the collective have produced an ongoing series of work which explores the life and legacy of Barbara Cleveland: a mythical Australian performance artist who was active in the 1970s and who disappeared in 1981. The group previously worked under the title ‘Brown Council’ then ‘Barbara Cleveland Institute’ before taking the name ‘Barbara Cleveland’ in 2016.

Selected performances and presentations 
20th Biennale of Sydney
2018 Adelaide Biennial 
Art Gallery of NSW (Sydney)
Museum of Contemporary Art (Sydney) 
Artspace (Sydney)
Australian Experimental Art Foundation (Adelaide)
Performance Space (Sydney)
Monash University Museum of Art (Melbourne)
The Physics Room (Christchurch) 
National Museum of Modern and Contemporary Art (Seoul).

Collections
Their works are held in the permanent collections of Artbank, Museum of Contemporary Art Australia, the Art Gallery of New South Wales, Campbelltown Arts Centre, Monash University Museum of Art and the Gallery of Modern Art, Brisbane.

References

External links 

Artist biography, list of works, links to published articles

Australian performance artists
University of New South Wales alumni
2011 establishments in Australia
Artists from Sydney
21st-century Australian women artists
21st-century Australian artists